Germany was represented by Bianca Shomburg, with the song "Zeit", at the 1997 Eurovision Song Contest, which took place on 3 May in Dublin. "Zeit", composed by prolific Eurovision duo Ralph Siegel and Bernd Meinunger, was the winner of the German national final, held on 27 February.

Before Eurovision

Der Countdown läuft 
The final was held in Lübeck, hosted by Jens Riewa. Nine songs took part and the winner was chosen by televoting, converted into percentages. "Zeit" received over three times more votes than the second-placed song. Other participants included the previous year's German winner Leon – who had notoriously been eliminated in the audio-only pre-qualifying round of the 1996 Eurovision – and Michelle, who would represent Germany in 2001.

At Eurovision 
On the night of the final Shomburg performed 11th in the running order, following Spain and preceding Poland. At the close of voting "Zeit" had received 22 points, placing Germany joint 18th (with Bosnia-Herzegovina) of the 25 entries. Germany was one of five countries chosen to trial televoting in the 1997 contest, and the 12 points were awarded to Turkey.

Voting

References 

1997
Countries in the Eurovision Song Contest 1997
Eurovision
Eurovision